Jonathon Lloyd "Jon" Huber (born July 7, 1981) is a former professional baseball pitcher. Huber played two seasons in Major League Baseball, both with the Seattle Mariners. Over his major league career, Huber compiled a win-loss record of 2–1 with a 2.57 ERA, and 19 strikeouts in 25 games.

Early life and amateur career
Huber was born on July 7, 1981 in Sacramento, California. He attended North Fort Myers High School in Fort Myers, Florida. He is one of four players from North Fort Myers High School to have Major League Baseball experience including Mike Greenwell, Jim Miller, and Deion Sanders.

Professional career

San Diego Padres
Huber was drafted by the San Diego Padres in the 5th round (139th overall) of the 2000 Major League Baseball draft. He began his professional career in 2000 with the rookie-level AZL Padres. Huber went 1–4 with a 6.60 ERA, and 39 strikeouts in 14 games; 10 starts. In 2001 Huber played for the rookie-level Idaho Falls Padres of the Pioneer League. He went 5–9 with a 6.04 ERA, and 75 strikeouts in 15 games; all starts. Huber was promoted to the Class-A Fort Wayne Wizards of the Midwest League in 2002. He went 8–12 with a 5.12 ERA, and 86 strikeouts in 28 games; 26 starts. Huber was first on the team in losses, complete games (2), hits allowed (168), runs allowed (99), and walks allowed (59); second in games started, wins, strikeouts, and home runs allowed (7); and third in innings pitched (149). In 2003 Huber split the season between the Class-A Fort Wayne Wizards and the Class-A Advanced Lake Elsinore Storm. With the Wizards, Huber went 1–1 with a 3.76 ERA, and 34 strikeouts in 7 games; all starts. In 12 games with the Storm, Huber went 3–5 with a 5.18 ERA, and 43 strikeouts in 57 innings pitched. In his final season in the Padres' organization, Huber played for the Class-A Advanced Lake Elsinore Storm. He went 8–6 with a 3.70 ERA, and 100 strikeouts in 20 games; all starts. Huber lead the Storm in wins; was second in strikeouts, home runs allowed (9), and walks allowed (44); and was third in innings pitched (107), hits allowed (107), losses, games started, and runs allowed (44).

Seattle Mariners
Huber was acquired by the Seattle Mariners on July 30, 2004 for utility player Dave Hansen. He spent the rest of the 2004 season with the Class-A Advanced Inland Empire 66ers in the Mariners' organization. Huber went 4–1 with a 6.12 ERA, and 38 strikeouts in 7 games; 5 starts. After the season, Huber played in the Arizona Fall League with the Peoria Javelinas. He went 0–1 with a 6.43 ERA, and 27 strikeouts in 8 games; all starts in the AFL. In 2005, Huber attended spring training with the Mariners, however, he did not make the final roster and was assigned to minor league camp on March 16. That season, Huber was assigned to play with the Double-A San Antonio Missions of the Texas League. He went 7–8 with a 4.74 ERA, and 112 strikeouts in 26 games; all starts. Huber was first on the Missions in shutouts (1), earned runs allowed (78); second in losses, games started, runs allowed (87), home runs allowed (11), walks allowed (49), and strikeouts; and third in innings pitched (148), and hits allowed (159). In his major league debut on August 30, 2006 against the Los Angeles Angels of Anaheim, he struck out Howie Kendrick, the only batter he faced in  innings pitched. Before being promoted to the majors, Huber was 3–1 with a 2.61 ERA and 12 saves in 13 chances with the Triple-A Tacoma Rainiers. He appeared in 16 games with the Mariners in 2006 and another 9 in 2007, with a 2-1 record and 2.57 ERA.

Lancaster Barnstormers and Atlanta Braves
He became a free agent at the end of the  season and signed a minor league contract with the Detroit Tigers in February . The Tigers released him at the end of spring training and he signed with the Independent Lancaster Barnstormers of the Atlantic League. He appeared in 18 games with Lancaster before signing a minor league deal with the Atlanta Braves, who assigned him to the Triple-A Gwinnett Braves. He began the 2010 season with the Double-A Mississippi Braves, but he was released after just three appearances.

Los Angeles Dodgers
Huber subsequently signed with the Los Angeles Dodgers and was assigned to the Double-A Chattanooga Lookouts. He became the closer for the Lookouts, appearing in 36 games with a 2.23 ERA and 18 saves. In 2011, he was assigned to the Triple-A Albuquerque Isotopes. He appeared in 8 games with a 10.24 ERA before he was released on May 7.

Personal life
He resides in Buford, Georgia.

References

External links

www.huberpitching.com

1981 births
Living people
Albuquerque Isotopes players
Arizona League Padres players
Baseball players from Sacramento, California
Chattanooga Lookouts players
Fort Wayne Wizards players
Gwinnett Braves players
Idaho Falls Padres players
Indios de Mayagüez players
Inland Empire 66ers of San Bernardino players
Lake Elsinore Storm players
Lancaster Barnstormers players
Major League Baseball pitchers
Mississippi Braves players
People from Buford, Georgia
Peoria Javelinas players
San Antonio Missions players
Seattle Mariners players
Sportspeople from the Atlanta metropolitan area
Tacoma Rainiers players
Tiburones de La Guaira players
American expatriate baseball players in Venezuela